Fabio Staibano (born 20 April 1983) is an Italian rugby union footballer. He plays as a prop.

Staibano was born in Eboli.  He played at a youth level at Battipaglia Rugby, moving to Overmach Rugby Parma F.C., aged 18, where he would stay from 2001/02 to 2007/08. Staibano represented the French team of Castres Olympique for the 2008/09 and 2009/10 seasons. Fabio joined Aironi for the 2010/2011 season.

Staibano has 11 caps for Italy, having yet to score his first points. The Italian prop's first cap came at 11 June 2006, in a 52-6 win over Japan, in Tokyo. He played two games during the 2007 Six Nations Championship. He had been called as Carlo Del Fava replacement for the 2007 Rugby World Cup finals, but he was ruled out too, due an injury. Del Fava was ruled fit soon and took his place. Staibano was originally called up for the 2009 Six Nations Championship but he was left out of the final team.

References

External links
Fabio Staibano International Statistics

1983 births
Living people
People from Eboli
Italian rugby union players
Rugby union props
Italy international rugby union players
Sportspeople from the Province of Salerno